Armenia Travel Futsal Club, is an Armenian professional futsal club based in the capital Yerevan.

History
Armenia Travel Futsal Club was formed in 2015 by the "Armenia Travel" company and participated in the amateur Armenian Futsal Business League. However, they moved to professional level and started playing at the Armenian Futsal Premier League since the 2016-17 season. The club occupied the 6th place among 7 participants in their inaugural season.

Season by season

References

Charbakh
2015 establishments in Armenia
Futsal clubs established in 2015